Wolfgang Lange (3 July 1938 – 29 October 2022) was an East German sprint canoeist who competed in the 1960s. He won four medals at the ICF Canoe Sprint World Championships with a gold (K-4 1000 m: 1963) a silver (K-2 1000 m: 1963), and two bronzes (K-1 4 x 500 m: 1963, K-4 10000 m: 1966).

Lange also competed in two Summer Olympics, earning his best finish of seventh in the K-1 1000 m event at Rome in 1960.

References

External links

1938 births
2022 deaths
People from Lübz
Canoeists at the 1960 Summer Olympics
Canoeists at the 1964 Summer Olympics
Canoeists at the 1968 Summer Olympics
German male canoeists
Olympic canoeists of East Germany
Olympic canoeists of the United Team of Germany
ICF Canoe Sprint World Championships medalists in kayak